Barcelonnette – Saint-Pons Airport  is an airport located at Saint-Pons,  west of Barcelonnette, both communes in the Alpes-de-Haute-Provence department of the Provence-Alpes-Côte d'Azur region in France.

The airport is situated along the north side of the Ubaye river. It has an  unlit runway. It is open to national commercial traffic and private aircraft operating daylight visual flight rules.

Civil and military aircraft may refuel with avgas 100LL and TRO. There are no customs, nor police, but an SSLIA ("Airport and Aircraft Fire and Rescue Service") is provided at Level 1.

Air traffic control 
There is no air traffic control tower; traffic is controlled by automated information provision on 123.500 MHz.

Barcelonnette is a small airport dependent on the Provence aeronautical district; it uses no services of the Directorate General for Civil Aviation.

Clubs 
The airport is home to the Barcelonnette Glider Club (l'Ubaye Glider Club).

References

External links
 
  Aerial view

Airports in Provence-Alpes-Côte d'Azur
Alpes-de-Haute-Provence